Joseph Harker Smith (October 21, 1873 – October 17, 1923) was an American football player and coach. He served as the head football coach at the Multnomah Athletic Club in 1896 and at the University of Oregon in 1897.

Head coaching record

College

References

External links
 

1873 births
1923 deaths
19th-century players of American football
American football fullbacks
Oregon Ducks football coaches
Players of American football from Oregon